In mathematics, there are many kinds of inequalities involving matrices and linear operators on Hilbert spaces. This article covers some important operator inequalities connected with traces of matrices.

Basic definitions
Let  denote the space of Hermitian  matrices,  denote the set consisting of positive semi-definite  Hermitian matrices and  denote the set of positive definite Hermitian matrices. For operators on an infinite dimensional Hilbert space we require that they be trace class and self-adjoint, in which case  similar definitions apply, but we discuss only matrices, for simplicity.

 
given the spectral decomposition

Operator monotone

A function  defined on an interval  is said to be operator monotone if for all  and all  with eigenvalues in  the following holds,

where the inequality  means that the operator  is positive semi-definite. One may check that  is, in fact, not operator monotone!

Operator convex

Note that the operator  has eigenvalues in  since  and  have eigenvalues in 

Joint convexity

A function  defined on intervals  is said to be   if for all  and all

Trace function

where  has eigenvalues  and  stands for a trace of the operator.

Convexity and monotonicity of the trace function
Let  : ℝ → ℝ be continuous, and let  be any integer. Then, if  is monotone increasing, so 

it is strictly convex if  is strictly convex.

See proof and discussion in, for example.

Löwner–Heinz theorem
For , the function  is operator monotone and operator concave.

For , the function  is operator monotone and operator concave.

For , the function  is operator convex. Furthermore, 
 is operator concave and operator monotone, while 
 is operator convex.

Klein's inequality 
convex functions :(0,∞) → ℝ, the following inequality holds,
 
In either case, if  is strictly convex, equality holds if and only if  = .

Proof
,

Define
.
By convexity and monotonicity of trace functions,   is convex, and so for all ,
,
which is,
,

Taking the limit  yields,
,
which with rearrangement and substitution is Klein's inequality:

Golden–Thompson inequality

In 1965, S. Golden  and C.J. Thompson  independently discovered that

For any matrices ,

This inequality can be generalized for three operators: for non-negative operators ,

Peierls–Bogoliubov inequality
Let  be such that Tr eR = 1.
Defining , we have 

The proof of this inequality follows from the above combined with Klein's inequality. Take .

Gibbs variational principle
Let  be a self-adjoint operator such that  is trace class. Then for any  with 

with equality if and only if

Lieb's concavity theorem
The following theorem was proved by E. H. Lieb in. It proves and generalizes a conjecture of  E. P. Wigner, M. M. Yanase and F. J. Dyson. Six years later other proofs were given by T. Ando  and B. Simon, and several more have been given since then.

 is jointly concave in 

Here  stands for the  adjoint operator of

Lieb's theorem
For a fixed Hermitian matrix , the function

The theorem and proof are due to E. H. Lieb, Thm 6, where he obtains this theorem as a corollary  of Lieb's concavity Theorem.
The most direct proof is due to H. Epstein; see M.B. Ruskai papers, for a review of this argument.

Ando's convexity theorem
T. Ando's proof  of Lieb's concavity theorem led to the following significant complement to it:

is convex.

Joint convexity of relative entropy 
For two operators  define the following map

Statement
The map  is jointly convex.

Proof
For all ,  is jointly concave, by Lieb's concavity theorem, and thus

is convex. But

and convexity is preserved in the limit.

The proof is due to G. Lindblad.

Jensen's operator and trace inequalities
The operator version of Jensen's inequality is due to C. Davis.

A continuous, real function  on an interval  satisfies Jensen's Operator Inequality if the following holds

See, for the proof of the following two theorems.

Jensen's trace inequality
Let  be a continuous function defined on an interval   and let   and   be natural numbers. If   is convex, we then have the inequality

for all (1, ...
all (1, ... ,  n) of  ×   matrices with 

Jensen's operator inequality
For a continuous function  defined on an interval  the following conditions are equivalent:
  is operator convex.
 For each natural number  we have the inequality

for all  bounded, self-adjoint operators on an arbitrary Hilbert space  with
  for each isometry  on an infinite-dimensional Hilbert space  and

Araki–Lieb–Thirring inequality

E. H. Lieb and W. E. Thirring proved the following inequality in  1976: For any   and 

In 1990  H. Araki generalized the above inequality to the following one: For any   and 
 
 
for 

There are several other inequalities close to the Lieb–Thirring inequality, such as the following: for any   and 

and even more generally: for any    and 

Effros's theorem and its extension
E. Effros in  proved the following theorem.

Ebadian et al. later extended the inequality to the case where  and  do not commute .

Von Neumann's trace inequality and related results

with equality if and only if  and  share singular vectors.

A simple corollary to this is the following result: For Hermitian  positive semi-definite complex matrices  and  where now the eigenvalues are sorted decreasingly ( and  respectively),

See also

References

Scholarpedia primary source.

Operator theory
Matrix theory
Inequalities